Wakanda is a fictional nation in the Marvel Universe.

Wakanda may also refer to:

Wakanda (software), a JavaScript platform
 Wakandas, a fictional African people in Edgar Rice Burroughs' 1915 novel The Man-Eater
 Wakanda, a cognate term of Wakan Tanka, translated as the "Great Spirit" and occasionally as "Great Mystery" in Lakota spirituality among indigenous North American peoples
 Wakanda, a minor character in the book Harry Potter and the Deathly Hallows  (2007).

See also
 Great Spirit (disambiguation)
 Wauconda (disambiguation)
 Wakonda (disambiguation)